Danielle Rose Collins (born December 13, 1993) is an American professional tennis player. She has reached career-high WTA rankings of No. 7 in singles and world No. 86 in doubles. Collins has won two WTA Tour singles titles, at the 2021 Palermo Open and the 2021 Silicon Valley Classic. She reached her first major singles final at the 2022 Australian Open.

Collins played collegiate tennis at the University of Virginia and won the NCAA singles title twice, 2014 and 2016, during her sophomore and senior years. She finished her career at Virginia in 2016 as the top-ranked collegiate player. Having first established herself on the WTA Tour when she reached the semifinals of the 2018 Miami Open as a qualifier, her breakthrough came at the 2019 Australian Open, where she reached the semifinals, defeating world No. 2, Angelique Kerber, en route. Collins was also a quarterfinalist at the 2020 French Open in singles, and a semifinalist at the 2022 Wimbledon Championships in doubles.

Career

College
While at Virginia, Collins won the collegiate national title in 2014 and 2016 and the Honda Sports Award as the nation's best female tennis player in 2016.

2009–2012
In 2009, Collins played her first events on the ITF Women's Circuit. She won her first ITF singles title in 2011.

2013–2017: WTA Tour debut and turning professional
She did not play any professional matches in 2013 and 2015 while she was playing college tennis at Virginia.

Collins made her WTA Tour main-draw debut as a wildcard at the 2014 US Open in the Arthur Ashe Stadium, where she forced second seed Simona Halep to a third-setter in the first round.

In mid-2016, she turned fully professional. During her time on the ITF Circuit, she won four singles titles.

2018: Breakthrough and top 50

Collins started the year reaching the final round of qualifying at the Australian Open before being outclassed by Denisa Allertová, in two sets.  

However, she received a wildcard at the WTA 125 tournament at Newport Beach, and claimed the title there, which saw her rise to a career-high ranking of No. 120 at that time.

Another impressive run at another WTA 125 tournament, this time in Indian Wells, saw her reach the quarterfinals and thus earn a wildcard for the Indian Wells Open, a Premier Mandatory tournament that also takes place there. There, she won her first ever WTA Tour match against compatriot Taylor Townsend, before beating world No. 14, Madison Keys, in straight sets, followed by a victory over Sofya Zhuk. Although her run ended in the fourth round to former world No. 6, Carla Suárez Navarro, Collins made her top-100 debut, jumping from No. 117 to 93.
Getting through the qualifying rounds at the Miami Open, Collins beat world No. 37, Irina-Camelia Begu, in straight sets before upsetting two-time major semifinalist CoCo Vandeweghe, in three sets. Victories over Donna Vekić and Monica Puig followed, before she earned the biggest victory of her career, beating her idol, former world No. 1 and seven-time Grand Slam champion, Venus Williams, who was the eighth-ranked player coming into their encounter. With this win she became the first qualifier ever to reach the semifinals at the Miami Open. She then faced sixth-seeded Jeļena Ostapenko and lost in straight sets, despite having a set point in the first set. After making it to the quarterfinals in Monterrey, Collins broke into the top 50 for the first time.

Collins only won back-to-back main-draw matches at two other tournaments the rest of the season, reaching the third round of the Eastbourne International and the semifinals in San Jose (both Premier-level events) and lost in the opening round at the remaining three Grand Slams. Nonetheless, she finished the year ranked No. 36 in the world, more than 100 spots above her previous best year-end ranking.

2019: Australian Open semifinal, top 25 debut, Wimbledon doubles quarterfinal

Her rise continued at the Australian Open. Prior to the tournament, she had never won a match at a major event. After upsetting 14th seed Julia Görges in a tough first-round match, Collins won her next three matches in straight sets; first against Sachia Vickery, then against 19th seed Caroline Garcia. In the round of 16, Collins pulled off the biggest upset of the tournament, dominating the second seed and three-time major champion Angelique Kerber, in straight sets. She thus reached the quarterfinals, where she defeated Anastasia Pavlyuchenkova in three sets. In the semifinals, she lost to eighth seed Petra Kvitová, in two sets. Collins rose to a career-high ranking of No. 23 on 28 January 2019, following the tournament.

She also recorded wins at all the other Grand Slam events, reaching the second round at the French Open and US Open as well as the third round at Wimbledon. 
She achieved her best-ever Grand Slam doubles result at Wimbledon, reaching the quarterfinals with Bethanie Mattek-Sands. Collins struggled outside of the majors though, reaching the quarterfinals at just one tournament (the Charleston Open). In December, she won the Hawaii Open, an exhibition tournament, upon the withdrawal of her finals opponent Angelique Kerber. Collins finished the year ranked world No. 31.

At the end of 2019, Collins revealed that she was suffering from rheumatoid arthritis, similar to Caroline Wozniacki.

2020: French Open quarterfinalist

Collins began 2020 with three wins over top-15 opponents. She defeated world No. 5 Elina Svitolina in the first round at the Brisbane International before falling to world No. 13, Madison Keys, in straight sets in the quarterfinals. The following week at the Adelaide International, she defeated No. 15 Sofia Kenin in the second round, and then No. 7, Belinda Bencic in the quarterfinals. Collins fell to world No. 1, Ashleigh Barty in three sets in the semifinals. She lost in the second round to Yulia Putintseva at the Australian Open, and dropped outside the top 50 due to failing to defend her semifinalist points.

Due to the six-month shutdown of the WTA Tour caused by the COVID-19 pandemic, Collins did not play again after the Australian Open until August. She lost in the opening round of her first two tournaments back, to Jil Teichmann at the Western & Southern Open and Anett Kontaveit at the US Open. However, Collins rebounded at the French Open, where she reached her second career Grand Slam quarterfinal. Along the way, she upset two-time Grand Slam champion and former world No. 1, Garbiñe Muguruza, in the third round (handing the Spaniard her earliest exit from Roland Garros since 2013) as well as 30th seed Ons Jabeur, both in three sets. Her run ultimately came to an end against compatriot and reigning Australian Open champion Sofia Kenin, in a match that for both players was their fourth three-setter of five matches.

2021: Maiden WTA title and first WTA 500 title, return to top 30
Danielle Collins was sidelined for the first half of the season with debilitating pain in her back. She was diagnosed with endometriosis and proceeded to have a "tennis-ball sized" cyst removed. In addition to that surgery, Collins was also taking medication for rheumatoid arthritis.

Collins won her first WTA title at the Palermo Ladies Open, defeating Elena-Gabriela Ruse, in straight sets in the final.

The following month, she won her second WTA title at the Silicon Valley Classic, defeating Daria Kasatkina in three sets. The Silicon Valley Classic win marked her first WTA 500 title. As a result, she reentered the top 30 at world No. 28, on August 9, 2021.

She then continued her win streak at the Canadian Open. She beat Jil Teichmann in the first round and then went on to defeat sixth seed Simona Halep in the second. Her 12-match win streak eventually came to an end in the third round, after losing to compatriot Jessica Pegula, in three sets.

At the US Open, she reached the third round for the first time after defeating former world No. 6, Carla Suárez Navarro and Kaja Juvan. She then lost her third-round match to Aryna Sabalenka, in straight sets.

In her next two tournaments, Collins reached the quarterfinals in Chicago and the third round in Indian Wells before concluding her season in Linz, where she was forced to retire in her semifinal match against compatriot Alison Riske due to a shoulder injury. Nonetheless, Collins finished the year ranked inside the top 30 for the first time, at No. 29.

2022: First Grand Slam final, top 10 debut, American No. 1, US Open fourth round
At the Australian Open, Collins reached the semifinals for the second time, after defeating 19th seed Elise Mertens to become the third American woman in the quarterfinals. It was the second year in a row that three Americans have featured at this stage of the tournament. In the quarterfinals, she beat Alizé Cornet in straight sets. She defeated Iga Świątek also in straight sets in the semifinals to advance to her first Grand Slam final, where she faced world No. 1, Ashleigh Barty. Świątek said that Collins hit the,"...fastest balls I have ever played in a match." In the final, Collins lost in straight sets despite being 5–1 up in the second set. As a result of her performance, Collins made her top-10 debut and became the American No. 1 female player. At the French Open, she lost to fellow American Shelby Rogers, in straight sets, in the second round. In Wimbledon, Collins lost in the first round to Marie Bouzková, in three sets. At the same tournament, partnering Desirae Krawczyk, she reached the quarterfinals for a second time and then the semifinals for the first time at a major in doubles in her career.

Seeded 19th at the US Open, she reached the round of 16 for the first time upon defeating two-time US Open champion Naomi Osaka, Cristina Bucșa, and Alizé Cornet. In the fourth round, she lost to world No. 6 and eventual semifinalist Aryna Sabalenka in three sets.

2023 
At the Australian Open, seeded 13th, Collins lost in the third round to Elena Rybakina in three sets.

At the inaugural edition of the 2023 ATX Open in Austin, Texas, she reached the semifinals defeating Anna Kalinskaya.

World TeamTennis
Collins played her first season with World TeamTennis in 2019 with Billie Jean King's Philadelphia Freedoms. She started the 2020 season on the Orlando Storm roster which began July 12, but was dismissed from the league after leaving the state and breaching COVID-19 safety protocols.

Playing style
Collins employs a highly aggressive playing style that has been described as "fearless", "ferocious" and "fun to watch". She has a powerful serve, and strong groundstrokes on both wings, making her one of the hardest hitters on the WTA Tour. Her style allows her to hit a high number of winners, but also a considerable number of high-risk unforced errors. Her greatest strengths are her kick serve, her inside-out forehand, and her versatile and strong backhand.  Her double-handed backhand is atypically stronger than her forehand. She also possesses strong volleying skills, allowing her to hit winners from any position on the court. Iga Świątek mentioned that Collins, "hits the fastest ball I have ever played in a match."

Personal life
Collins is the daughter of Walter and Cathy. She graduated from Northeast High School, St. Petersburg, Florida, in 2012. As a high school player, her junior ranking was good enough to get her a scholarship from the University of Florida (UF). After her freshman year, she transferred to the University of Virginia (UVA). She won the NCAA singles title in her sophomore and senior years.

During her freshman year at UF, she majored in Liberal Arts and Sciences Exploratory. Collins graduated from UVA with a bachelor's degree in media studies and business. She returned to UF for graduate school to earn a master's in sports management in a program partnering with the WTA.

Career statistics

Grand Slam performance timelines

Singles

Doubles

Significant finals

Grand Slam tournament finals

Singles: 1 (runner-up)

Notes

References

External links

 
 
 
 Danielle Collins at Virginia Sports

1993 births
Living people
Sportspeople from St. Petersburg, Florida
Virginia Cavaliers women's tennis players
American female tennis players
Tennis people from Florida
21st-century American women
People with Endometriosis